Cowley Thomas,  (27 June 1900 - September 1977) was a captain in the Royal Navy who served in Great War and  World War II. Between the wars he served in the Royal Navy Submarine Service. He retired in 1934, but was recalled to active duty in 1938. During the Second World War he served as the Naval Officer in Charge of Tripoli, Bizerta, Taranto, Port-en-Bessin and Antwerp.

Early life
William Cowley Thomas was born in Barry, Vale of Glamorgan, Wales, on 27 June 1900, the son of Henry John Thomas, a stockbroker. He joined the Royal Navy s a midshipman on 1 May 1917, and served on the battleship  during the Great War.

Between the wars
Thomas was promoted to acting sub-lieutenant on 15 January 1919. This became substantive on 15 September 1919. He was then promoted to acting lieutenant on 15 August 1921. After training on the yacht HMS Triad, he joined the Royal Navy Submarine Service. He served  in the Mediterranean as an officer on the submarine  from September 1924 until May 1926. He then joined the cruiser . On 24 May 1928, he returned to submarines as an officer on the submarine . He assumed command of the submarine  on 24 May 1929. He was promoted to lieutenant commander on 15 August 1929, and served on the cruiser  in the Mediterranean from 21 April 1930 until 16 August 1931.

On 31 December, he assumed command of the submarine . He married Patricia Hamilton on 16 November 1931, and officially changed his name to just "Cowley Thomas". On 27 January 1933 he joined the submarine depot ship  on the China station. Then, on 4 May 1933, he assumed command of the submarine . He retired at his own request on 25 May 1934.

Second World War
On 29 September 1938, Thomas was recalled to active duty, and joined the crew of the battleship . On 13 August 1939, he joined the cruiser , where he was serving when the Second World War broke out. He was promoted to commander on 27 June 1940. After it was sunk by the Italians in the Raid on Souda Bay, he was assigned to HMS Nile, the Royal Navy shore establishment in Egypt, and served on the staff of the Commander-in-Chief, Mediterranean Fleet. He married a second time on 10 September 1941, to Mary Fedora Douglas-Watson, a pianist and composer. She was the widow of a fellow naval officer, Commander Francis Douglas-Watson, and the daughter of former Australian senator Anthony St Ledger.

Thomas became the Naval Officer in Charge (NOIC) in Tripoli on 1 March 1943, and HMS Hasdrubal (the naval base at Bizerta) on 1 July 1943. He participated in the Allied Invasion of Sicily, for which he was mentioned in despatches. He became the NOIC at Taranto in Italy on 9 September 1943. He returned to the UK in February 1944, and became the NOIC on the Isle of Wight, with the acting rank of captain.  He earned a second mention in despatches for his role in Operation Overlord, the Allied invasion of Normandy, during which he served as NOIC of Port-en-Bessin, the main petroleum port for the Allied forces.  For his "skill, resource and organisation in the opening-up of Port-en-Bessin", he was made an Officer of the Order of the British Empire on 9 March 1945. From September 1944 until 22 October 1945, he was the NOIC of Antwerp in Belgium, the largest port serving the Allied forces.

Later life
On 18 December 1945, with the war over, Thomas was placed on the retired list again. For his services, he was made a Commander of the Belgian Order of Leopold, and was advanced to the rank of Commander of the Order of the British Empire in the 1946 Birthday Honours.

Thomas died in Hove, Sussex, on 4 September 1977. He had no children.

Notes 

1900 births
1977 deaths
Captains of the Royal Navy
Commanders of the Order of the British Empire
Royal Navy personnel of World War I
Royal Navy personnel of World War II
Welsh military personnel